The 2019 National League play-off Final , known as the Vanarama National League Promotion Final for sponsorship reasons, was a football match played at Wembley Stadium in London on 11 May 2019 to decide the second team to be promoted from the National League to EFL League Two for the 2019–20 season. The culmination of the 2019 National League play-offs saw Salford City beat AFC Fylde 3–0 to earn promotion alongside the National League champions Leyton Orient. The match had a record low attendance.

Match

Details

References

play-off Final 2019
2019
Play-off Final 2019
Play-off Final 2019
Events at Wembley Stadium
National League play-off final
National League play-off Final